Hege Solbakken (born 22 July 1972, in Austevoll) is a Norwegian politician for the Centre Party.

In 2000, while the first cabinet Bondevik held office, she was appointed political advisor in the Ministry of Fisheries. In 2008, while the second cabinet Stoltenberg held office, she was appointed State Secretary in the Ministry of Transport and Communications.

She took her education at the University of Bergen, and was deputy leader of the Studentersamfunnet i Bergen in 1999. She has also been active in Nei til EU.

References
Hege Solbakken - regjeringen.no

1972 births
Living people
Centre Party (Norway) politicians
Politicians from Bergen
Norwegian state secretaries
University of Bergen alumni
People from Austevoll